Jacques Boulas (20 October 1948 – 29 September 1990) was a French racing cyclist. He finished in last place in the 1975 Tour de France.

References

External links
 

1948 births
1990 deaths
French male cyclists
People from Étampes
Sportspeople from Essonne
Cyclists from Île-de-France
20th-century French people